Revok (born 1977 in Riverside, California) birth name Jason Williams  is an American graffiti artist. The name comes from the movie Scanners by David Cronenberg. 

In 2012 Revok started the Detroit Beautification Project.

In 2018 Revok filed a cease-and-desist letter to H&M clothing retailer, claim that the company infringed on his artwork, using it in one of their brand logos. H&M in turn, sued Revok asserting he could not claim copyright on art work created illegally (street art/graffiti). The issue was settled in Revok's favor.

Exhibitions 
Solo Exhibitions
 Tragedy & Triumph, Vicious Gallery, Hamburg, 2011.

 Ordinary Things, Library Street Collective, Detroit, 2012.
 Pose-Revok, The Mine Gallery, Dubai, 2014.
 Revok, Ruttkowski;68, Köln, 2015.
 Revok, Library Street Collective, Los Angeles, 2015.

Books 
 Roger Gastman: Revok – Made in Detroit, Gingko Press. 2014, .

References

External links 

 Official site

American graffiti artists
1977 births
Living people